Qualifying for the 2010 FIBA World Championship in Turkey commenced as early as 2007 and will culminate in the five continental championships in each of the five FIBA zones. The final ranking of each continental championship determines which teams go to Turkey for the world championship, with FIBA allocating slots partly based on a zone's strength.

In addition to the host, the gold medalists in the 2008 Olympic basketball championship are also allocated automatic berths to the championship. Teams that failed to crack the top positions in their respective continental championships may still be selected as wild cards to fill out the 24-team cast.

A total of 106 countries participated in qualification to the world championship. This is less than in the 2010 FIFA World Cup (204) and 2010 FIVB Men's World Championship (109), but more than the 2011 Rugby World Cup (98) and the 2011 Cricket World Cup (about 100).

Qualified teams

Turkey is automatic qualifier as the host country. The USA also received an automatic berth for winning the 2008 Olympic men's basketball tournament.

Eighteen other teams qualified through continental qualifying tournaments, and FIBA invited four more "wild card" teams to fill out the 24-team field. Each FIBA zone is allocated a certain amount of automatic berths based upon the strength of its zone: the weakest zone, Oceania, gets only two automatic berths each, while Europe gets six.

Certain peculiarities include:
On the Oceanian championship, only two teams registered to compete, and with Oceania having two automatic berths, both were automatically qualified.
Turkey, despite being qualified already, still played at the European championships.  Had Turkey finished sixth or higher, the seventh-placed team would also have qualified.
The USA did not send a team to the Americas championship because they had automatically qualified by winning the gold medal in the men's Olympic basketball tournament.

Qualifying tournaments:
The draw for the championship took place in Istanbul on December 15, 2009.

Summary
These are the final standings of the different World Championship qualifying tournaments. The venues are as follows, with the city of the knockout stage mentioned first:
Men's Olympic basketball tournament: Beijing (China)
FIBA Africa Championship 2009: Benghazi, Tripoli (Libya) 
FIBA Americas Championship 2009: San Juan (Puerto Rico)
FIBA Asia Championship 2009: Tianjin (China)
EuroBasket 2009: Gdańsk, Poznań, Warszawa, Wrocław, Bydgoszcz, Łódź, Katowice (Poland)
FIBA Oceania Championship 2009: Sydney (Australia) and Wellington (New Zealand)
Wild cards: Istanbul (Turkey)

References

External links
 
 

Q
FIBA Basketball World Cup qualification
2008 in basketball
2009 in basketball